San Serac is a one-man disco music group performed by Nat Rabb. San Serac’s music combines esoteric philosophical lyrics with electronic music reminiscent of '80s Prince, Pet Shop Boys or Cameo. San Serac has released three full-length albums and a 3" CD single on Frog Man Jake Records, and a 12" on Output Recordings.

In 2006, San Serac performed at North East Sticks Together. In 2007, he completed a full United States tour with Junior Boys, and also played tours in the U.S. and Canada with Shout Out Out Out Out and Tigercity.

A new San Serac EP, Music Never Ends, was released by Environ on November 10, 2009.

Discography 

 Ghosts (3" CD single, 2001) (with Zek Lightning)
 Human Savagery Is a Slippery Slope (2003)
 Ice Age (2004)
 Professional (2007)
 Friends/In the End It's Your Friends (2008, split with Shout Out Out Out Out)

Notes

External links
 The Official San Serac Website
 The Official Frog Man Jake Records Website
 Audio interview with San Serac on Well-Rounded Radio

American disco groups
American electronic musicians
Musical groups from Massachusetts